Wes McLean is a former Canadian politician, who was elected to the Legislative Assembly of New Brunswick in the 2010 provincial election. He represented the electoral district of Victoria-Tobique as a member of the Progressive Conservatives  until the 2014 provincial election, when he did not run for re-election.

Before becoming an MLA, he worked as political staffer in New Brunswick and Ottawa, including the offices of Prime Minister Stephen Harper and Senate Leader Marjory LeBreton.

During his term, he served as deputy house leader of the Progressive Conservative caucus, and parliamentary secretary to the premier. He was stripped of his responsibilities following an impaired driving charge, to which he pleaded guilty, in May 2013.

References

Progressive Conservative Party of New Brunswick MLAs
Living people
People from Perth-Andover
21st-century Canadian politicians
Year of birth missing (living people)